The Kingdom of Israel may refer to any of the historical kingdoms of ancient Israel, including:

Fully independent (c. 564 years)
Kingdom of Israel (united monarchy) (1047–931 BCE), the legendary kingdom established by the Israelites and uniting them under a single king
Kingdom of Israel (Samaria) (930 – c. 720 BCE), the kingdom of northern Israel
Kingdom of Judah (930–587/586 BCE), kingdom of southern Israel
Hasmonean Kingdom of Judea (140–37 BCE), kingdom ruled by the Hasmoneans or "Maccabees", primarily known as Judea (or cognates) but also named Israel in the First Book of Maccabees

Self-governing region (c. 240 years)
Yehud Medinata (539–332 BCE), autonomous province of the Persian Achaemenid Empire, translated as "the province of Judah" or Israel
Herodian Kingdom of Judea, client kingdom ruled by Herod the Great (37–4 BCE), and to varying degrees by his heirs (the last Agrippa II lived to c. 100 CE), primarily known as Roman Judea (or cognates) but also called Israel in the Gospels and Book of Acts

See also
Kingdom of Israel (group), Israeli political movement
Kingdom of Jerusalem (1099–1291 CE)
Israel, the modern country
Israel (disambiguation)